Saad Ahmed Ibrahim Al Mohannadi ( born  in Doha), is currently the President of Public Works Authority Ashghal. Saad is fluent in English.

Biography 
HE Dr Eng. Saad Ahmed Ibrahim Al Mohannadi was appointed as the new President of the Public Works Authority Ashghal based on Emiri Decree No. 4 of 2017 as of January 4, 2017.
.

HE Dr Eng. Saad Al Mohannadi began his engineering career after graduating from Qatar University in 1997 with a bachelor's degree in Electrical Engineering. He also received a master's degree from Qatar University in 2009. He received his doctorate in 2016 from France titled “Methods of Decision Making to Manage Mega Projects – a study for the Qatar Railways project” .

HE Dr Eng. Al Mohannadi has worked for more than 19 years, during which he held several leadership and managerial positions in Qatar within the energy and transportation sector. He also held major roles such as Head of Control Center, Electrical Grid Planning Manager, Technical Affairs Manager at Qatar General Electricity and Water Corporation (Kahramaa).
From 2011, HE Dr Eng. Al Mohannadi was the CEO of Qatar Railways Company, the company responsible for designing and developing the railway network in Qatar and then managing, operating and maintaining it once it is completed.

HE Dr Eng. Al Mohannadi has extensive experience in project management, planning and urban development, and added value to the performance of the institutions, which has earned him the membership of several prestigious regional and national committees.

Awards
 2013 Vision Project Award at the Global Infrastructure Leadership Forum in New York (pending reference check)
 2015 Qatar's power list 
2018 Leadership Excellence Award, Istanbul Technical University, TURKEY
2018 Distinguished Alumni Award, Qatar University, Achievements in Many Leadership and Management Roles in QATAR

References

External links
 Ashghal Official Website

Qatari engineers
Living people
1975 births